The 2017–18 season was FC Mariupol's 18th season in the top Ukrainian football league. Mariupol competed in Premier League and Ukrainian Cup.

Players

Squad information

Transfers

In

Out

Pre-season and friendlies

Competitions

Overall

Premier League

League table

Results summary

Results by round

Matches

 FC Mariupol was assigned 3–0 victory by FFU, after Dynamo Kyiv refused to play the match in Mariupol

Ukrainian Cup

Statistics

Appearances and goals

|-
! colspan=14 style=background:#dcdcdc; text-align:center| Goalkeepers

|-
! colspan=14 style=background:#dcdcdc; text-align:center| Defenders

|-
! colspan=14 style=background:#dcdcdc; text-align:center| Midfielders 

|-
! colspan=14 style=background:#dcdcdc; text-align:center| Forwards

|-
! colspan=14 style=background:#dcdcdc; text-align:center| Players transferred out during the season

Last updated: 20 May 2018

Goalscorers

Last updated: 20 May 2018

Clean sheets

Last updated: 20 May 2018

Disciplinary record

Last updated: 20 May 2018

References

External links 
Official website

Mariupol
FC Mariupol